Horace Belton (July 16, 1955 – May 28, 2019) was a Canadian Football League and National Football League running back and Grey Cup champion.

Belton played his college football at Southeastern Louisiana University and began his career in 1977, playing only 2 regular season games for the Montreal Alouettes (rushing for 126 yards). He played in the 1977 Grey Cup, with 12 carries for 36 yards and 4 receptions for 30 yards. He then played 3 seasons with the Kansas City Chiefs, as a running back and kick returner, rushing for 486 total yards.

He died on May 28, 2019, aged 63.

References

External links
CFLAPEDIA BIO
FANBASE BIO
PRO-FOOTBALL REFERENCE BIO

1955 births
2019 deaths
Kansas City Chiefs players
Montreal Alouettes players
Southeastern Louisiana Lions football players
African-American players of Canadian football
Players of American football from Baton Rouge, Louisiana
Sportspeople from Baton Rouge, Louisiana
20th-century African-American sportspeople
21st-century African-American people